Jason DeFord (born December 4, 1984), known professionally as Jelly Roll (sometimes written as JellyRoll), is an American rapper and country singer known for his collaborations with  Lil Wyte, Struggle Jennings, Yelawolf, Tech N9ne, and Ryan Upchurch.

Early life 
Jason DeFord grew up in Nashville, Tennessee, in the southside community of Antioch.

Career 
Jelly Roll's 2010 collaboration "Pop Another Pill" with Memphis rapper Lil Wyte reached over 6.3 million YouTube views. This song led to the album Year Round by the hip-hop group SNO, released on the Hypnotize Minds label in April 2011 and produced by DJ Paul and Juicy J. SNO's song "Come Here White Girl" was named among "The 10 Most Memorable White Rapper Collaborations" by XXL.

Jelly Roll released many mixtapes including the Gamblin' on a Whiteboy series and the Therapeutic Music series. His independently released debut solo studio album The Big Sal Story was released on October 26, 2012. He released two collaborative albums with Haystak, two collaborative albums with Lil Wyte, four collaborative albums with Struggle Jennings and one album under the group SNO with Lil Wyte and BPZ.

Jelly Roll's 2013 mixtape Whiskey, Weed, & Women was originally named Whiskey, Weed, & Waffle House, but was later changed after the restaurant threatened legal action over the use of their name and logo on the cover. The replacement cover featured a "cease and desist" stamp in place of the Waffle House logo.

Personal life 
Jelly Roll is married to Bunnie DeFord aka Bunnie XO and has two children from a previous relationship.

Discography

Studio albums

Extended plays

Mixtapes

Singles

Other charted and certified songs

References 

21st-century American rappers
1986 births
American country singer-songwriters
American male singers
BBR Music Group artists
Living people
People from Nashville, Tennessee
People from Antioch, Tennessee
Rappers from Tennessee
Singers from Tennessee
Southern hip hop musicians
Country rap musicians
American country rock musicians